Witchcraft is deeply rooted in many African countries and communities in Sub-Saharan Africa. It has been specifically relevant in Ghana's culture, beliefs, and lifestyle and continues to shape lives daily. It has promoted tradition, fear, violence, and spiritual beliefs. The perceptions on witchcraft change from region to region within Ghana as they do in other countries in Africa, with the commonality that it is not something to take lightly, and the word spreading fast if there are rumours surrounding civilians practicing it. The actions taken by local citizens and the government towards witchcraft and violence related to it has also varied within regions in Ghana. Traditional African religions have depicted the universe as a multitude of spirits that are able to be used for either good or evil through religion. 

Witchcraft beliefs are deeply rooted in Ghanaian culture and can be traced back to hundreds of years before colonial powers in the country were even present. Today it continues to influence actions and lifestyle through accusations and fear behind witchcraft. Accusations against women and violence are common within the topic of witchcraft, many of them ending in murder and public killings. Witchcraft is observed through numerous lenses varying from local Ghana to how the Western world views the subject and researches it from the action itself to its political undertones and actions surrounding the topic.

History and culture 
A cursory survey of Ghanaian society illustrated how prevalent witchcraft beliefs in Ghana are. Details of witch beliefs and the nocturnal lives of witches are depicted in letters and local newspapers across the country. Witchcraft accusations are commonly seen through various forms of media including television, newspaper, and magazines. Shelagh Roxburgh concluded through field research that there is no clear definition of what witchcraft is exactly, but there is a common factor in what civilians perceived it as: it causes harm. A common reference to witches in Ghana is through the term "spirits", to many losing the status of human in the process of interacting with spirits. Witches are distinguished from healers which use power for aiding rather than "evil".

Precolonial famous practices in Ghana, included odum poison ordeal and "corpse-carrying" , which was a practice where people would carry a dead body and the body would point to the individual responsible for the death through witchcraft. These practices often led to convictions for witchcraft which varied from medicine usage, to public executions, and even selling individuals to slavery. The Native Administration Ordinance, or NAO granted the Gold Coast Tribunals the authority to take on witchcraft cases in 1927. The practice of witchcraft was added to existing law with a series of limitations and rules to follow in the future. This would take a toll on the jurisdiction and power courts of villages have limiting them in comparison to the power colonial rules have.

Music 
The topic of witchcraft is often brought up in songs, and is present in the music culture in Ghana. Hearing about the topic through music adds to its broader relevance in its culture. Sang in Akan, the dominant non-English language in Ghana, popular songs reference witchcraft as explanation for things such as infertility, alcoholism, and death. The constant negativity relating to the subject supports the fear in witchcraft engraved in Ghanaian culture, leading to acts of violence as a response to possible threats, rumours, and observations. Legal trials related to witchcraft inspired much song writing and reports of increased radio airtime of music related to the themes of witchcraft presented in court,  reaffirmed the relevance of the beliefs of witchcraft in culture, entertainment, and legal spaces.

Religion 
The 2012 WIN-Gallup International 'Religion and Atheism Index' claimed that Ghana is the most religious country in the world with 96 percent of it population identifying as religious .Popular religions in Ghana such as Christianity and Islam coexist with the beliefs of spirits, evil, and witchcraft illustrated in traditional beliefs. There is an intersection of religion brought through colonization and existing precolonial beliefs related to witchcraft. In predominantly Christian communities, it is common to find articles and news on what "good" Christians can do to fight evil forces of witchcraft. 

The Roman Catholic mission in Ghana refused any of the members of the church to participate in activities surrounding the oracle. The head father, K. Strebler from the mission in the Gold Coast expresses his discomfort with members being accused of being witches. Father Strebler threatened members of the church with severe punishments if they were to go to Suhum, where doctors determined if witch powers were present in one's life and instead insisted that accused members should seek protection. Protestant and Muslim leaders also expressed discomfort, but did not act directly against oracle traditions.

Ethnic groups 
The Kwahu people in Ghana, who live by the Kwahu sandstone plateau do not display the topic of witchcraft openly, and have built a culture of spreading the word about rumours and accusations hiding from the direct public eye.

Spirit children 

A "spirit child" in Ghana is a disabled child who is believed to possess magical powers to cause misfortune. Disability in Ghana is greatly stigmatized and the only way considered acceptable to deal with the problem is to kill them via advice by a witchdoctor. Spirit children are referred to as chichuru or kinkiriko in the Kassena-Nankana district in Northern Ghana. These children primarily come from poor, rural areas. However, if a spirit child is known to be "good" there are no punishments for the child or their family.

Violence against women 
As a result of accusations of magic and witchcraft, reports of women being lynched, burned, and beaten became common. Many women across Ghana live in constant fear of being accused and not being allowed an explanation. The existence of witch camps and government interventions have been some of the local and national response to violence resulting from accusations of witchcraft activities.

Witch camps 

A witch camp is a place for women to seek refuge from being killed by local citizens and neighbours and can reach a sense of safety. They are said to have been active for more than 100 years. Traditionally, these camps are run by tindanas, or local chiefs able to cleanse women and the community of any danger from witchcraft. Today, they are still ran by local chiefs, but they are in threatened of being shut down by the government. Up to 1000 women have reportedly lived in these camps with very limited resources including the lack of running water and electricity. FIDA has advocated for the closing and abolition of witch camps as part of a movement against violence and women's rights. The government of Ghana has condemned witch camps, but has rarely addressed violence related to the subject of witchcraft through direct action and protocols.

Interventions 
A famous case in 1930, reported by The Gold Coast Times, dealt with a woman in the town of Winneba, Ghana, who was ordered by her local tribe to be tested through the oracle. The oracle was a shrine located in the Akan state of Akyem Abukwa, commonly used to determine the state of innocence of a woman dealing with witchcraft accusations. The practice involved a Tongo priest stabbing a fowl and throwing it down. The way the bird fell determined if the woman were to be innocent or guilty of witchcraft practices. If the bird fell breast down, a woman would be reassured as innocent.

If the woman was to be found guilty through the oracle she would be treated through medicine to get rid of witchcraft powers which were referred to as bayi by the people of Akan. The woman arrested in this case reported was a Christian woman, which incited protests by her family claiming that it was common for women to be mistreated and beaten when taken to the Tongo oracle to be tested for witchcraft power. Disputes over the Tongo oracle led to the Gold Coast colonial government to revoke the power from Native Tribunals to judge cases of witchcraft.

Witch-hunting became outlawed after this case in 1930, but later revisions in 1932 allowed for voluntary participation to be available. Conflicts rose when village chiefs would imprison or fine people for involvement with witchcraft even after it was outlawed by colonial rule. In modern times, the existence of non-profit organization such as Go Home serves accused women in reaching reconciliation with their village and reach peace with neighbours and family members.

References

African witchcraft
Ghanaian culture
Religion in Ghana